Roya Megnot (May 29, 1962 - May 10, 2009) was an American actress who played mainly in television films and series.

She died of a brain tumor in 2009.

Filmography

Television
1998 : Thirst
1991 : The 100 Lives of Black Jack Savage (TV Movie) : Reya Montenegro
1987 : Night Rose : Kara Akhbar

TV series
1992 : Silk Stalkings : Mia Cortez
1992 : MacGyver : Mukti
1991 : The 100 Lives of Black Jack Savage (TV Series) 
1991 : Tales from the Crypt (Easel Kill Ya" episode') : Sharon
1990 : DEA : Isabella Solana
1990 : Quantum Leap : Sybil
1989 : True Blue 
1984-1988, 1990 : Loving'' : Ava Rescott Masters #2

References

External links

American television actresses
Deaths from brain tumor
1962 births
2009 deaths
20th-century American actresses
21st-century American women